Tiago Filipe dos Santos Pires (born 2 January 1987) is a Portuguese professional footballer who plays as a defender.

Club career

Italy
Born in Lisbon, Pires spent ten years at the Sporting Clube de Portugal academy, but could never represent the club as a senior. He signed with Italian side Genoa C.F.C. in the 2006 summer, but was limited to reserve team football during his spell, also being loaned to AC Lugano in the Swiss Challenge League along with Alessandro Di Maio, Rivaldo González and Diogo Tavares and to Potenza S.C. alongside José Mamede.

Tiago was an unused substitute for Potenza at the start of 2008–09 season.

Portugal
Pires returned to his country in the 2009 off-season, going on to have one-season spells in the third division with CD Operário, Juventude Sport Clube, Atlético SC, U.D. Leiria and Associação Naval 1º de Maio. He moved back to Switzerland in 2014, joining amateurs (sixth level) AC Vallemaggia.

References

External links
 
 Gazzetta dello Sport profile 
 
 Fullsoccer
 

1987 births
Living people
Footballers from Lisbon
Portuguese footballers
Association football defenders
Segunda Divisão players
Sporting CP footballers
Genoa C.F.C. players
FC Lugano players
Potenza S.C. players
Juventude Sport Clube players
U.D. Leiria players
Associação Naval 1º de Maio players
Swiss Challenge League players
Portuguese expatriate footballers
Expatriate footballers in Italy
Expatriate footballers in Switzerland
Portuguese expatriate sportspeople in Italy
Portuguese expatriate sportspeople in Switzerland